Varandi Moti is a village in Kutch District. The nearest road NH 8A (National Highway) is about 1.11 km away. The geo location is N 23° 4' 1.4" &  E 69° 2' 40.59"

References

External links 
 Varandi Moti temporary website
 Varandi Moti Photos
 View in Google Maps

Villages in Kutch district